Mélanie Georgiades (born 25 July 1980 in Nicosia), better known by her stage name Diam's, is a retired French rapper of Greek Cypriot origin.

Biography
Mélanie Marie Georgiades was born on July 25, 1980 in Nicosia, capital of Cyprus.  Her mother is French and her father is Greek Cypriot.  After her parents separated, she arrived in France with her mother at the age of three.  She spent her childhood in Paris, then in the department of Essonne, in Brunoy, until the age of thirteen.

She studied for a while in Igny, in the private Saint-Nicolas college.  Later, she moved to Massy then to Orsay in the suburban district of Mondetour, where she spent most of her adolescence.  She discovered rap with the album The Chronic (1992) by Dr. Dre and the first title of the group NTM, Je rap (1990) (published on Rapattitude, the first compilation of French rap).  She chose her pseudonym of Diam's in 1995, a choice she explains as "I came across the definition of the word diamond and I learned that a diamond can only be broken by another diamond and that it is only made  of natural elements".

Beginnings (1994-2002)
In 1995, at the age of fifteen, she attempted suicide by ingesting a large dose of medication.  In 2003, she recounted her past (she was beaten by her companion at the age of 17) in a song called Ma souffrance.

She formed a group called Mafia Tres. In 1997, the group released a first maxi of four titles where Diam's appeared on two tracks.  Diam's is known, thanks to its participations on the first album of the Mafia Trece entitled Cosa Nostra in 1997, and thanks to an appearance on Phonograph with the rap group ATK.

After her separation from the Mafia Tres, Diam's will release her first album, Premier Mandat in 1999, but it was not a success, selling 9,000 copies.

In 2001 the title Suzy broadcast on the compilation Original Bombattack on radio Générations 88.2.  The song is picked up on the Internet.  Suzy comes to the ears of Jamel Debbouze who becomes her friend and "guide".  She then chained appearances in featuring, participation in radio shows.  She finally prepares her second album, entitled Brut de femme and the record company EMI offers her a contract in April 2002. The project is abandoned following a restructuring of EMI while the two titles Pogo and 1980 are broadcast by a journalist on the Internet before their official release.

Success (2003-2009)
She signs on the Hostile label after long negotiations.  The tracks are reworked and finally integrated into his second album, Brut de femme. Brut de femme quickly went gold and the single DJ was certified platinum.  Diam's won a Victoire de la Musique for the best rap album of the year 2004.

She took a stand against Marine Le Pen and her National Rally party (formerly the National Front), especially  in the song "Marine", which was released on her DVD Ma Vie/Mon Live in 2004.  She also stands against Nicolas Sarkozy, whom she called a demagogue and a fascist in La Boulette and Ma France à moi.

In 2005, she cemented her importance as a songwriter with "Ma Philosophie"—a huge number one hit for Pop Idol star Amel Bent.

In 2006 she returned with the album Dans ma bulle,  debuting at number one on the French album chart selling 50,000 copies in its first week. Diam's first single from Dans Ma Bulle, La Boulette gained immense popularity and airtime. It stayed at number one on the French music charts for 6 consecutive weeks. Her second single Jeune Demoiselle debuted at #4. Ma France à moi and Confessions nocturnes with Vitaa also proved to popular. Dans Ma Bulle went on to be the biggest-selling French album in France in 2006.

Diam's won three awards at the NRJ Music Award in 2007 (Francophone female artist of the year, Francophone album for Dans ma bulle and Francophone song for La boulette). Le Figaro newspaper estimated that Diam's achieved revenues of 2.66 million euros for her album.

After a year away from the media, Diamis returns in 2009 with her fourth and final album, SOS, which ranked first in album sales in France when it was released on November 16, 2009, achieving sales of more than 300,000 copies in France. The first single Enfants du désert from his new album, whose clip takes a scene from the film Forrest Gump where the hero runs across the United States. The disc marks the metamorphosis of the artist.

Retirement (2012-Now) 
In July 2012, she published her book Diam's Autobiographie. On September 30, 2012, she announced on the show Sept à huit on TF1 the end of her career as a rapper.

In 2022, she made the documentary on her career, “Salam”, which  the former rapper will be presenting at the Cannes Film Festival. In a rare message posted to Instagram, Diam's, who had previously retired from social media, explained her motivation, and why she agreed to entrust her story to directors Houda Benyamina (Divine) and Anne Cissé, after refusing dozens of requests for years:

“I had the feeling that I was being asked to give the keys to my life so that others could make a film of it. A show. My depression, my suffering, my quest, my recognition: a film? An entertainment? I was touched that people were interested in my career, but it was impossible for me to let strangers speak for me… So I took up the pen again. The one thing I have always loved delivered me.”

Personal life
In 2007, she suffered from depression due to personal problems, which she returned to in the song Si c'était le dernier. Diagnosed as bipolar, she alternated between stays in a psychiatric hospital and her career as an artist. When she left the hospital, she decided to stop taking the medication, and she attempted suicide by swallowing sleeping pills.

In December 2008, she converted to Islam, she said that religion liberated her and helped her through these difficult ordeals.  In September 2009, she married her companion Aziz.  On October 8, 2009, Paris Match magazine published in pictures of her leaving a mosque in Gennevilliers with her husband, wearing an Islamic veil.  In the midst of a debate on the banning of the full veil in public places, these stolen photos caused a scandal.

In 2010, Diam's won her complaint againstLe Nouvel Observateur magazine for violating her image rights and privacy after publishing a picture of Diam's wearing a headscarf without permission. The picture was placed in an article about French Muslims.

In the spring of 2012, Mélanie gave birth to a daughter named Maryam. In 2015, she married again, and gives birth to a boy named Abraham.

Discography

Albums

Singles

1 Digital Downloads

Recognitions

References

External links

Living people
1980 births
French rappers
French women rappers
French Muslims
French people of Cypriot descent
French people of Greek descent
Cypriot people of French descent
People from Nicosia
Converts to Islam
MTV Europe Music Award winners